Ripponden and Barkisland railway station was opened by the Lancashire & Yorkshire Railway on the Rishworth Branch in 1878 as Ripponden. Ripponden is in Calderdale, West Yorkshire, England. Its name was changed to Ripponden and Barkisland on 1 December 1891. The Lancashire and Yorkshire railway was absorbed by the London and North Western Railway on 1 January 1922, which became one of the constituents of the London, Midland and Scottish Railway on grouping in 1923. The latter company closed the station to passengers on 8 July 1929 and British Railways ceased goods traffic in 1958 after which the line was dismantled.

The branch connected  to the north with the terminus  to the south.

References

External links 
 Information about the Rishworth branch from Railway Ramblers
 Ripponden and Barkisland station on navigable 1947 O. S. map

Disused railway stations in Calderdale
Former Lancashire and Yorkshire Railway stations
Railway stations in Great Britain opened in 1878
Railway stations in Great Britain closed in 1929
railway station